The 1980–81 Oregon State Beavers men's basketball team represented the Oregon State University as a member of the Pacific 10 Conference during the 1980–81 NCAA Division I men's basketball season. They were led by 11th-year head coach Ralph Miller and played their home games on campus at Gill Coliseum in Corvallis, Oregon.

After winning their first 26 games of the season, Oregon State fell to No. 5 Arizona State in the regular season finale to finish at 26–1 (17–1 Pac-10), repeating as conference champion, and were ranked second in both polls. Despite dropping the regular season finale, they did not drop in the rankings, and were seeded No. 1 in the West region of the NCAA tournament.

The Beavers received an opening round bye, and were shocked by No. 8 seed Kansas State, 50–48, at Pauley Pavilion. The Wildcats would reach the Elite Eight before falling to eventual runner-up North Carolina. Oregon State finished the season at 26–2.

Roster

Schedule and results

|-
!colspan=9 style=| Regular Season

|-
!colspan=9 style=| NCAA Tournament

Rankings

Awards and honors
Steve Johnson – Consensus First-team All-American, Pac-10 Player of the Year

NBA Draft

References 

Oregon State Beavers men's basketball seasons
Oregon State
Oregon State
NCAA
NCAA